Wallace Simon Moyle (May 14, 1867 – September 10, 1920) was an American college football player and coach. He served as the head coach at Lafayette, Dartmouth, and Brown.

Moyle attended Yale University, where he played football as an end. He graduated in 1891, and then took over as the head football coach at Lafayette College. Moyle served in that position for two years and amassed a record of 7–16–1. In 1893, Moyle became the first "all-season head coach" at Dartmouth College and posted a 9–7 record during his two-year tenure. The Indians' losses to Harvard, 16–0, and Yale, 28–0, were seen as evidence of improvement under Moyle. By comparison, Yale had routed Dartmouth, 113–0, in 1884, which marked the beginning of the so-called "Yale jinx". Dartmouth was awarded the Triangular Football Conference championship in both years of Moyle's tenure. In 1895, Moyle moved on to Brown University, where he amassed an 18–15–2 record over three years as head coach.

Head coaching record

References

External links
 

1867 births
1920 deaths
19th-century players of American football
American football ends
Brown Bears baseball coaches
Brown Bears football coaches
Dartmouth Big Green football coaches
Lafayette Leopards football coaches
Yale Bulldogs football players
Sportspeople from Plymouth, Devon
English players of American football